Puliyanthivu is an island of Sri Lanka and part of Batticaloa town. It has important infrastructures such as government buildings (District Secretariat. Municipal council, Post office, Public library, Teaching hospital, Bus stand, etc.), banks, schools, religious worship places and historical importance places, notably Batticaloa Fort.

Etymology
Batticaloa historical book Mattakalapputh Thamilakam quotes from Swami Vipulananda that Vedda’s chieftain Puliyan ruled the area and his name later adapted to the island. Puliyanthivu literally means "island of Puliyan" (thivu means island). Also, the book quotes from Mahavamsa that there was a caste called Pulinthar, which could be the reason for the name of island. As per the common naming of villages in Batticaloa, which called by name of tree and pond, the island could have been used the name of tree tamarind, since there was a lot of tamarind trees in the area. Tamarind is called Puli in Tamil. Literally, it means "island of tamarind".

History
In the 11th century, one the minister among seven ministers of king Kathirsuthan of Chola dynasty was ruled the area, and the minister name was Pulimaran.

References

Batticaloa
Islands of Sri Lanka
Landforms of Eastern Province, Sri Lanka